Elisabetta Cocciaretto was the defending champion but chose not to participate.

Anna Bondár won the title, defeating Verónica Cepede Royg in the final, 6–2, 6–3.

Seeds

Draw

Finals

Top half

Bottom half

References

Main Draw

Copa LP Chile - Singles